Hanan Kattan (born 22 May 1962) is a Jordanian-born, British-based film producer of Palestinian origin. She is also co-owner of multi-media entertainment company Enlightenment Productions.

Kattan created Enlightenment Productions in partnership with filmmaker/author Shamim Sarif.

Enlightenment Productions were Winner of the Kingston Business Excellence Awards 2014, Best Creative and Media Sector Business.

Career
Hanan is a multi-award-winning producer. She recently completed her fifth feature, Polarized, shot in Manitoba.  Her last feature release, Despite the Falling Snow, is the recipient of 13 awards and stars Rebecca Ferguson (Mission Impossible) and Charles Dance. She is currently developing a slate of movie and series projects focused on female protagonists and filmmakers, including The Athena Protocol series alongside Village Roadshow and Gran Via Productions. 

Kattan has produced three feature films through Enlightenment Productions including 1950s South African drama/love story The World Unseen and Hanan’s first feature film contemporary urban romantic comedy I Can't Think Straight debuted at Palm Springs Festival and won 11 awards. The World Unseen had its debut at Toronto Film Festival before going on to garner 23 awards internationally. Her 2011 feature documentary and directorial debut, The House of Tomorrow, was inspired by the TEDx HolyLand conference that Hanan co-curated in Jerusalem. 

Hanan is a member of BAFTA and Women in Film. She was selected for the TIFF Producers Lab and has spoken on panels at conferences such as DLD Women as well as at BAFTA and the BFI. She has also raised money for causes including the Nelson Mandela Children’s Fund.

Hanan is a voting member of BAFTA and a member of the CMPA (Canadian Media Producers Association).

Despite the Falling Snow:

At Cannes Festival 2013 Shamim Sarif and Hanan announced their new film Despite The Falling Snow.
The film starring Mission Impossible 5 Swedish actress Rebecca Ferguson, Game of Thrones actor Charles Dance, Oliver Jackson-Cohen, Antje Traue, Sam Reid, Anthony Head and Trudie Styler, which was released in 2015.

The film has won 13 awards to date, 3 at the Prague International Film Festival 3 more at the Milan International Film Festival and others at Los Angeles, Manchester, Sedona, Buffalo, Soho and Orlando  Film Festivals.

Kattan published her first book Grow Your Profits about online marketing in 2012 through Enlightenment Productions.

In 2013 Kattan won Entrepreneur of the Year award at the Kingston Business Awards.

In 2016 Kattan opened her Palestinian restaurant Tabun Kitchen in Soho, London.

Filmography
I Can't Think Straight (2008)
The World Unseen (2008)
The House of Tomorrow (2011)
Despite The Falling Snow (2015)
Polarized (2022 • In Post-Production)

Personal life 
After nearly 20 years she married the writer and director Shamim Sarif. They live in Surrey with their two sons.

References

External links

 

Palestinian film producers
Living people
1962 births
Palestinian businesspeople
Film producers from London